Jakob Meiland (Senftenberg, 1542-Hechingen, 31 December 1577) was a German composer. His St. Matthew Passion follows the model of Johann Walter's first Lutheran passion historia (c. 1530) but has more elaborate choral numbers.

Works
 St Matthew Passion
 Sacrae aliquot cantiones latinae et germanicae, quinqué et quatuor vocum Frankfurt 1575

References

1542 births
1577 deaths
16th-century German composers
German Baroque composers